Beach Cities Robotics is a FIRST Robotics Competition (FRC) team from the South Bay area in Southern California. Team is composed of members from both Mira Costa High School and Redondo Union High School.

Beach Cities Robotics (Team 294) won the 2010 FIRST Breakaway competition in Atlanta, Georgia, along with alliance partners, Team 67 (HOT Team), and Team 177 (Bobcat Robotics).
Beach Cities Robotics also won the 2001 FIRST National Championship, and the FIRST Tech Challenge (Quad Quandary) World Championship in 2008.

Beach Cities Robotics often participates in outreach activities in the South Bay, doing demos for middle schools and science events in the community, as well as attending local school district and city council meetings. The team participates in the annual Northrop Grumman open house.

History
Beach Cities Robotics has been a participant in the FIRST program since late 1996 when Hope Chapel Academy, Hawthorne High School, Mira Costa High School, and Redondo Union High School to form one of the first two Southern California teams, Team 61-”Circuit Breakers”. Several individuals (Dr. Beverly Rohrer, K.G. Englehardt, Rob Steele, and Pat Hosken) were instrumental in bringing that original team together with much support from ADTECH, the consortium behind the team’s formation. In 1998, Hope Chapel split off to form their own team, Team 330-”Beach Bots”. Hawthorne, Redondo, and Mira Costa stayed together and were sponsored by TRW and ADTECH, calling themselves the “Vultures”. In 1999, Hawthorne split off to become Team 207-”Metal Crafters” and Redondo and Mira Costa became 294-”Beach Cities Robotics”. In spring 2002, BCR became a year-round program, with students and mentors working more than 2000 hours during the build season.

2014
The 2014 FRC game, Aerial Assist, focused on assists between allied robots in the scoring of a 24" yoga ball on the opposite side of the field. Alliances gained additional points for receiving assists from other robots, launching the ball over the truss and catching it, and scoring in a high goal.  
Team 294's robot, Wavelength, was designed to focus on launching over the truss and scoring high. The team developed a linear shot mechanism and 6CIM drive in order to accomplish these tasks.  
It competed in the Inland Empire and Los Angeles Regional Competitions.

2016
Beach Cities Robotics competed in the 2016 FRC game, Stronghold. Stronghold was one of the most challenging FRC games yet, with robots crossing various field obstacles and scoring foam "boulders" into goals on the opposite side of the field. Beach Cities Robotics' robot, named Dominus, had a pneumatic intake and adjustable arm that allowed them to shoot the boulders from anywhere on the field, as well as a 4CIM drive to cross the field obstacles. It competed in the Los Angeles and Orange County Regional Competitions.

Achievements
 2019 FRC Ventura Regional finalists
 2019 FRC Ventura Regional Creativity Award
 2019 FRC Los Angeles Regional Creativity Award
 2019 FRC Orange County Regional Creativity Award
 2018 FRC Aerospace Valley Regional finalists
 2018 FRC Aerospace Valley Regional Industrial Design Award
 2018 FRC Orange County Regional Innovation in Control Award
 2017 FRC Central Valley Regional Entrepreneurship Award
 2016 FRC Hopper Division Semifinalists
 2016 FRC Orange County Regional semifinalists
 2016 FRC Orange County Industrial Design Award
 2016 FRC Los Angeles Regional finalists
 2016 FRC Los Angeles Quality Award
 2015 FRC Inland Empire Regional semifinalists
 2015 FRC Los Angeles Regional Quarterfinalists
 2014 FRC Los Angeles Regional Winner
 2014 FRC Los Angeles Dean's List Finalist (Ryan Gulland)
 2014 FRC Los Angeles Quality Award
 2014 FRC Inland Empire Regional finalists
 2014 FRC Inland Empire Industrial Design Award 
 2013 FRC Central Valley Xerox Creativity Award
 2012 FRC Los Angeles Regional finalists 
 2011 FRC San Diego Finalists
 2010 FRC World Champions  
 2010 FRC Newton Field Coopertition Award
 2010 FRC San Diego Regional Champions  
 2010 FRC Los Angeles Regional finalists
 2009 FRC Los Angeles Regional finalists
 2008 FTC World Champions
 2008 FRC Los Angeles Regional finalists
 2008 FRC San Diego Regional Champions
 2007 FRC San Diego Regional Champions
 2004 FRC Southern California Regional Chairman's Award 
 2003 FRC Southern California Regional finalists
 2001 FRC National Champions
 2001 FRC Southern California Regional Champions

Sponsors
Northrop Grumman,
Boeing,
Google,
Raytheon,
Impresa Aerospace, 
Cooler Master,
John Deere.

References

FIRST Robotics Competition teams
Manhattan Beach, California
Redondo Beach, California